Tuf Fazel Tahalyun (also Romanized as Ţūf Fāz̤el Tahalyūn) is a village in Chin Rural District, Ludab District, Boyer-Ahmad County, Kohgiluyeh and Boyer-Ahmad Province, Iran. At the 2006 census, its population was 68, in 14 families.

References 

Populated places in Boyer-Ahmad County